The Manhattan Community Board 10 is a New York City community board encompassing the neighborhoods of Harlem and Polo Grounds in the borough of Manhattan. It is delimited by Fifth Avenue and Mount Morris Park on the east, Central Park on the south, Harlem River drive, Edgecombe Avenue, Saint Nicholas Avenue, the 123rd street and Morningside Avenue on the west, as well as by the Harlem River on the north.

Demographics
As of 2010, the Community Board has a population of 115,723 up from 107,109 in 2000 and 99,519 in 1990. Of them, 72,858 (63.0%) are African-American, 11,050 (9.5%) are White non Hispanic, 2,833 (2.4%) Asian or Pacific Islander, 356 (0.3%) American Indian or Native Alaskan, 362 (0.3%) of some other race, 2,572 (2.2%) of two or more races, 25,692 (22.2%) of Hispanic origins. 42.7% of the population benefit from public assistance as of 2012, down from 45.3% in 2005.

References

External links
Official site of the Community Board

Community boards of Manhattan